Osoyoos Secondary is a public high school in Osoyoos, British Columbia that is part of School District 53 Okanagan Similkameen.

Osoyoos Secondary is located in the Okanagan Valley in south-central British Columbia. The school population includes 202 students from grade 8–12, 18 teachers and 10 support staff. School District 53 trustees voted on April 6, 2016, to close the school in order to avoid budget deficit. The students and town fought back and got the school to stay open.

References

High schools in British Columbia
Schools in the Okanagan
Educational institutions in Canada with year of establishment missing